Asier Guenetxea Sasiain (born 15 May 1970) is a Spanish former road cyclist, who competed as a professional from 1992 to 1996. He competed in two editions of the Vuelta a España, and had 11 professional wins in his career.

Major results

1990
 1st Stages 1 & 4 Tour du Poitou-Charentes
1991
 1st Clásica de Almería
1992
 1st Stage 5 Vuelta a Castilla y León
 1st Stages 2 & 4 Volta a Portugal
 5th Trofeo Masferrer
1993
 1st Clásica de Sabiñánigo
 1st Stage 2 Vuelta a Castilla y León
1994
 1st Trofeo Alcudia
 1st Stage 3 Troféu Joaquim Agostinho
1995
 1st Stages 4 & 8 Volta ao Algarve
 1st Stage 1 Grande Prémio Jornal de Notícias
1996
 1st Stage 6 Volta ao Alentejo
 2nd Clásica de Almería
 10th Philadelphia International Cycling Classic

References

External links

1970 births
Living people
Spanish male cyclists
Cyclists from the Basque Country (autonomous community)
People from Debagoiena
Sportspeople from Gipuzkoa